This is a list of alternative metal artists. Alternative metal (or alt-metal) is a style of heavy metal and alternative rock.

Alternative metal usually takes elements of heavy metal with influences from genres like alternative rock and other genres not normally associated with metal, such as hardcore punk, funk, and progressive rock. Alternative metal bands are often characterized by heavy guitar riffs, melodic vocals, unconventional sounds within other heavy metal genres, unconventional song structures and sometimes experimental approaches to heavy music.

See also
 List of American grunge bands
 List of alternative rock artists
 List of industrial metal bands
 List of nu metal bands
 List of post-grunge bands
 List of experimental metal artists

References

Alternative metal
 
Alternative metal